Life Center Academy is a private school located in Burlington in Burlington County, in the U.S. state of New Jersey.

The school is associated with the Fountain of Life Center, an Assemblies of God church. The Headmaster is Matthew Boudwin, who also serves as a pastor of the church. The school is divided into three sections: Little Angel Preschool, the Elementary, which contains the students from Kindergarten to 6th grade; and the Upper School, which contains the students from 7th to 12th grade. Tracy Cossabone is the Principal, Ben Flick is the Assistant Principal, and Julia Ferrara is the Preschool Director.

As of the 2017–18 school year, the school had an enrollment of 229 students (plus 22 in PreK) and 25 classroom teachers (on an FTE basis), for a student–teacher ratio of 9.2:1.

Athletics
Athletic Director: Tammy Nowicki
School colors: red, white, and black
School mascot: The Warrior
Athletic Association: Penn-Jersey Athletic Association

The Life Center Academy boys soccer team won the NCSAA national championship in 2021 with a 3–2 overtime win against Blair County Christian School in the tournament final. It was the program's second national title, the other being the NACA title in 2001.

Notable alumni

Elo Edeferioka (born 1993), Nigerian basketball player for Celta de Vigo Baloncesto and the Nigerian national team.
Malik Ellison (born 1996), professional basketball player for BC Kolín of the Czech National Basketball League.
Stojan Gjuroski (born 1991), professional basketball player for Pelister of the Macedonian First League.
Aleks Marić (born 1984), former professional basketball player.
Juliet Richardson (born 1980), singer.
Trayvon Reed (born 1995), professional basketball player for BC Dinamo Tbilisi of the Georgian Superliga.
LaQuinton Ross (born 1991), American basketball player for Hapoel Eilat of the Israeli Basketball Premier League
Dion Waiters (born 1991), former basketball player; played college basketball for Syracuse. Won a championship in 2020 with the Los Angeles Lakers.

References

External links
Life Center Academy
Fountain of Life Center

1975 establishments in New Jersey
Educational institutions established in 1975
Private elementary schools in New Jersey
Private middle schools in New Jersey
Private high schools in Burlington County, New Jersey